Oliver Ackland (born 9 November 1979) is an Australian actor.

Biography
In 2009 he was awarded the inaugural Heath Ledger scholarship by Australians in Film.

Ackland starred in Ben Lucas' Wasted on the Young, which premiered at the 2010 Sydney Film Festival and screened at the 2010 Toronto International Film Festival.  His other feature film credits include Roger Scholes’ Cable and John Hillcoat's feature The Proposition.

In 2011, he appeared as 'Toby Raven' in the mini-series realization of Tim Winton's Cloudstreet, directed by Matthew Saville, and as 'Rhys' in The Slap, adapted from the novel by Christos Tsiolkas. Ackland's other television credits include All Saints, Always Greener, Young Lions and Outriders. He also appeared in the telemovie Emerald Falls and co-starred in the miniseries Jessica, both directed by Peter Andrikidis.

In 2012, Ackland was seen in the comedy horror film, 100 Bloody Acres, directed by Colin and Cameron Cairnes, Richard Gray's feature Blinder and the ABC telemovie, The Mystery of a Hansom Cab.

Ackland has appeared in numerous short films including Maggie Betts' 2014 film Engram (starring alongside Isabel Lucas), Damian Walshe-Howling's The Bloody Sweet Hit and Eve directed by Hannah Hilliard.

Filmography

Film

Television

Music videos

References

External links 

1979 births
Living people
Australian male film actors
Australian male television actors
People educated at Cranbrook School, Sydney
21st-century Australian male actors